The Dragon Storm is a giant thunderstorm located in Saturn's Southern hemisphere, which is labeled as the "storm alley" region. It acquires its energy in the deep layers of Saturn's atmosphere and produces radio waves that reflect during its burst of short static which helped Cassini detect it.

The Dragon Storm (named in September 2004 for its unusual shape) is a large, bright and complex convective storm in Saturn's southern hemisphere. It appears to be long-lived and periodically flares up to produce dramatic white cloudy plumes that then subside. This is similar to the extreme conditions on Jupiter at the site of its Great Red Spot, an anticyclonic storm that has been continuously observed since 1830. The Dragon Storm is a strong source of radio emissions, which are interpreted by Cassini scientists as electric events similar to lightning on Earth.

Cassini detected a burst of radio emissions when the Dragon Storm started rising over the horizon during the night time of the planet. The burst came to a stop when it hit the sunlight. During the night time of Saturn, the storm starts; as soon as it hits sunlight, it completely stops. This pattern repeats, seeming to go on and off for a few weeks as Saturn rotates.

See also 

Extraterrestrial cyclone 
Great Dark Spot 
Great White Spot
Oval BA
Small Dark Spot

References

External links
 
 NASA article on Dragon Storm
https://www.nasa.gov/mission_pages/cassini/multimedia/pia06197.html

Saturn
Planetary spots